Diaphania contactalis is a moth in the family Crambidae. It was described by Paul Dognin in 1903. It is found in Colombia, Venezuela, Brazil, Peru, Ecuador and Bolivia. The habitat consists of cloud forests.

The length of the forewings is 11.9–13 mm for males and 12.1-13.3 mm for females. The forewings are light brown and with a light purple gloss. There is a translucent, almost triangular band on the hindwings.

References

Moths described in 1903
Diaphania